Lake Panorama is a census-designated place located in Cass Township and Victory Township in Guthrie County, Iowa, United States. In the 2010 census the population was 1,309 and, in the 2020 census, the population was 1266. 

It is located in east-central Guthrie County and is bordered to the southeast by the city of Panora. The CDP is a residential community on both sides of Lake Panorama, a reservoir constructed on the Middle Raccoon River.

Demographics

Local Traditions

The Annual Merryman Broomball Tournament is a broomball tournament that takes place annually between December and February on Lake Panorama, Iowa.

References

Census-designated places in Iowa
Populated places in Guthrie County, Iowa